Humberto Maturana Romesín (September 14, 1928 – May 6, 2021) was a Chilean biologist and philosopher. Many consider him a member of a group of second-order cybernetics theoreticians such as Heinz von Foerster, Gordon Pask, Herbert Brün and Ernst von Glasersfeld.

Maturana, along with Francisco Varela and Ricardo B. Uribe, was known for creating the term "autopoiesis" about the self-generating, self-maintaining structure in living systems, and concepts such as structural determinism and structural coupling. His work was influential in many fields, mainly the field of systems thinking and cybernetics. Overall, his work is concerned with the biology of cognition. Maturana (2002) insisted that autopoiesis exists only in the molecular domain, and he did not agree with the extension into sociology and other fields:

The molecular domain is the only domain of entities that through their interactions give rise to an open ended diversity of entities (with different dynamic architectures) of the same kind in a dynamic that can give rise to an open ended diversity of recursive processes that in their turn give rise to the composition of an open ended diversity of singular dynamic entities.

Life and career
Maturana was born in Santiago, Chile. After completing secondary school at the Liceo Manuel de Salas in 1947, he enrolled at the University of Chile, studying first medicine in Santiago, then biology in London and Cambridge, Mass. In 1954, he obtained a scholarship from the Rockefeller Foundation to study anatomy and neurophysiology with J. Z. Young (who later wrote the foreword to The Tree of Knowledge) at University College London. He obtained a PhD in biology from Harvard University in 1958.

He worked in neuroscience at the University of Chile, in the Biología del Conocer (Biology of Knowing) research center. Maturana's work has been developed and integrated into the work on ontological coaching developed by Fernando Flores and Julio Olalla.

In 1994, he received Chile's National Prize for Natural Sciences.

Maturana established his own reflection and research center, the Instituto de Formación Matriztica. In 2020 he was awarded an honorary fellowship of the Cybernetics Society.

Maturana died in Santiago on May 6, 2021, at age 92, due to pneumonia.

Work

Maturana's research interest concerns concepts like cognition, autopoiesis, languaging, zero time cybernetics and structural determined systems. Maturana's work extends to philosophy and cognitive science and even to family therapy. He was inspired by the work of the biologist Jakob von Uexküll.

His inspiration for his work in cognition came while he was a medical student and became seriously ill with tuberculosis.  Confined in a sanatorium with very little to read, he spent time reflecting on his condition and the nature of life. What he came to realize was "that what was peculiar to living systems was that they were discrete autonomous entities such that all the processes that they lived, they lived in reference to themselves ... whether a dog bites me or doesn't bite me, it is doing something that has to do with itself." This paradigm of autonomy formed the basis of his studies and work.

Maturana and his student Francisco Varela were the first to define and employ the concept of "autopoiesis", which was Maturana's original idea. Aside from making important contributions to the field of evolution, Maturana is associated with an epistemology built upon empirical findings of neurobiology. Maturana and Varela wrote in their Santiago Theory of Cognition: "Living systems are cognitive systems, and living as a process is a process of cognition. This statement is valid for all organisms, with or without a nervous system."

Reflections on life and association with Francisco Varela
In an article in Constructivist Foundations. Maturana described the origins of the concept of autopoiesis and his collaboration with Varela.

In popular culture
Maturana influenced — and appears in coded form as a character in the novel Replay by German author Benjamin Stein.

Publications
The initial paper which stands as a prelude to all that followed:
 Biology of Cognition. Humberto R. Maturana. Biological Computer Laboratory Research Report BCL 9.0. Urbana IL: University of Illinois, 1970. As Reprinted in: Autopoiesis and Cognition: The Realization of the Living. Dordecht: D. Reidel Publishing Co., 1980, pp. 5–58.

Books
 1979 Autopoiesis and Cognition: The Realization of the Living With Francisco Varela. (Boston Studies in the Philosophy of Science).  ISBN 90-277-1015-5.
 1984 The tree of knowledge. Biological basis of human understanding. With Francisco Varela Revised edition (92) The Tree of Knowledge: Biological Roots of Human Understanding. 
 1990 Biology of Cognition and epistemology. Ed Universidad de la Frontera. Temuco, Chile.
 1992 Conversations with Humberto Maturana: Questions to biologist Psychotherapist. With K. Ludewig. Ed Universidad de la Frontera. Temuco, Chile. 1992.
 1994 Reflections and Conversations. With Kurt Ludewig. Collection Family Institute. FUPALI Ed. Cordova. 1994
 1994 Democracy is a Work of Art. Collection Roundtable. Linotype Ed Bogota Bolivar y Cia. 
 1997 Objectivity - An argument to force. Santiago de Chile: Ed Dolmen.
 1997 Machines and living things. Autopoiese to do Organização Vivo. With Francisco Varela Porto Alegre: Medical Arts, 1997. 
 2004 From Being to Doing, The Origins of the Biology of Cognition. With Bernhard Poerksen. Paperback, 2004
 2009 The Origins of humanness in the Biology of Love. With Gerda Verden-Zoller and Pille Bunnell.
 2004 From biology to psychology. Paperback.
 2009 Sense of humanity. Paperback.
 2008 Habitar humano en seis ensayos de biología-cultural. With Ximena Dávila.
 2012 The Origin of Humanness in the Biology of Love. With Gerda Verden-Zöller. Edited by Pille Bunnell. Philosophy Document Center, Charlottesville VA; Exeter UK: Imprint Academic, Imprint Academic.		
 2015 El árbol del vivir. With Ximena Dávila.
 2019 Historia de nuestro vivir cotidiano. With Ximena Dávila.-->

See also

 Autopoiesis
 Constructivism
 Ernst von Glasersfeld
 Francisco Varela
 Heinz von Foerster
 Molecular cellular cognition
 Neurobiology
 Neurophilosophy
 Post-rationalist cognitive therapy
 Second-order cybernetics
 Santiago theory of cognition
 Vittorio Guidano
 William Ross Ashby

References

Further reading
 Alexander Riegler and Pille Bunnell (eds.) (2011) The Work of Humberto Maturana and Its Application Across the Sciences. Special issue. Constructivist Foundations 6(3): 287–406, freely available at the journal's web site

External links

Humberto Maturana official website
Cultural Biology Certification - Brazil
Biology of Cognition Lab website
Appreciation of Maturana's work and philosophy (in Spanish with English subtitles)

1928 births
2021 deaths
20th-century Chilean non-fiction writers
20th-century Chilean male writers
21st-century Chilean non-fiction writers
21st-century Chilean male writers
20th-century Chilean philosophers
21st-century philosophers
Chilean biologists
Chilean scientists
Consciousness researchers and theorists
Cyberneticists
Systems biologists
Systems psychologists
Systems scientists
Theoretical biologists
Harvard University alumni
Alumni of University College London
People from Santiago
Members of the Chilean Academy of Sciences
Deaths from pneumonia in Chile
Chilean non-fiction writers